H-T Ranch is a historic ranch complex  west of Amidon, North Dakota. The ranch originally consisted of ten buildings; however, only the ranch house and log barn survive. The ranch served as the headquarters of the Little Missouri Cattle Company, which was run by Arthur Clark Hidekoper. Hidekober established the ranch in the 1880s, and by the end of the decade, it had become the "most notable" ranch in the area. The ranch house, called Shackford, was built in 1896; its uncommon style resembles a bungalow but also borrows from other styles such as the Stick style. By 1906, the Fargo Forum described the ranch as "the biggest and most important [ranch] in the state" and "one of the largest horse raising outlets in the world". In the same year, Hidekoper sold the  ranch; the sale was the largest land deal in North Dakota history.

The ranch was added to the National Register of Historic Places on July 5, 1985.

References

External links

Agricultural buildings and structures on the National Register of Historic Places in North Dakota
Houses completed in 1896
Ranches on the National Register of Historic Places
National Register of Historic Places in Slope County, North Dakota
American Craftsman architecture in North Dakota
1896 establishments in North Dakota
Bungalow architecture in North Dakota